Thomas Spencer  D.D. was  an English Anglican priest in the 16th century.

Spenser was educated at Magdalen College, Oxford.  He held the livings iat Hadleigh, Suffolk. He was  Archdeacon of Chichester from 1560 until his death on 6 July 1571.

Notes

1571 deaths
16th-century English people
Archdeacons of Chichester
Alumni of Magdalen College, Oxford